The Revolutionary Socialist Workers' Party (POSR) was a French socialist political party founded by Jean Allemane in 1890 and dissolved in 1901. It is indirectly one of the founding factions of the French Section of the Workers' International (SFIO), which was founded in 1905.

The POSR was founded by a dissidence from the Federation of the Socialist Workers of France (FTSF) led by Jean Allemane. The party, which along with Allemane was a strong believer of the primacy of syndicalism in politics, became a base of future revolutionary syndicalism and parties of a similar ideology would occasionally be described as Allemaniste.

However, next to the working-class socialism of Allemane, an intellectual socialist movement developed within the POSR, led by Lucien Herr, a librarian. This movement's priority was the education of the people. Overall, the POSR was a moderate reformist party, influenced by possibilism which believed that socialism could be achieved through democratic action, such as decentralization and legislative participation.

In 1901, the POSR merged with the FTSF and Independent Socialists to form the French Socialist Party (PSF).

In 1905, the PSF was along with the Socialist Party of France a founding member of the French Section of the Workers' International (SFIO).

See also 
 Federation of the Socialist Workers of France
 French Section of the Workers' International
 French Socialist Party
 History of the Left in France

Defunct political parties in France
Political parties of the French Third Republic
History of socialism
Socialist parties in France
Second International
1890 establishments in France
Political parties established in 1890
1901 disestablishments in France
Political parties disestablished in 1901